Collonista kreipli is a species of sea snail, a marine gastropod mollusk in the family Colloniidae.

Original description
 Poppe G.T., Tagaro S.P. & Stahlschmidt P. (2015). New shelled molluscan species from the central Philippines I. Visaya. 4(3): 15-59 page(s): 20, pl. 4 figs 1-3.

References

External links
 Worms Link

kreipli